Albin is an unincorporated community in Frederick County, Virginia, United States. Albin lies to the northwest of Winchester on North Frederick Pike (U.S. Highway 522). It was also known as Bryarly.

References

Unincorporated communities in Frederick County, Virginia
Unincorporated communities in Virginia